The roads in Nashville, Tennessee include Interstates 24, 65 and 40, with interchanges near the city center. There are nine U.S. highways serving the city. Two beltways surround Nashville.

Interstates

U.S. Highways

State routes

Notes

Notable streets
Broadway 
Church Street 
James Robertson Parkway
Jefferson Street
Music Row
Old Hickory Boulevard 
Printer's Alley
Rivergate Parkway

See also
Transportation in Nashville, Tennessee 
Tennessee Department of Transportation 
List of state routes in Tennessee 
List of numbered highways in Tennessee

References

Main references
Tennessee Department of Transportation 
TDOT - State highway system map, Davidson County
DeLorme (2010). Tennessee Atlas and Gazetteer. (Map)

Other references

External links
Nashville Convention and Visitor’s Bureau

Lists of roads in Tennessee
Transportation in Nashville, Tennessee
Transportation in Davidson County, Tennessee
Tennessee transportation-related lists
Nashville, Tennessee-related lists